Afghan Telecom (AfTel) is a telecom company offering fixed line, wireless voice and data services under a 25-year license in Afghanistan. The company is government owned and operated. In 2005, the Afghan Ministry of Communications spun it off into a private entity, while retaining oversight and control.

AfTel has roughly 20000 employees in 34 provincial capitals and 254 district centers and villages.  It offers traditional wire-line telephones and internet access in the major cities, a third generation GSM-based wireless local loop telephony, WiMAX and fiber based internet services, based on switching, wireless access and satellite equipment.

Afghan Telecom is a beneficiary of a USD $50 million World Bank grant to help government increase telecommunications network connectivity in Afghanistan.

In March 2018, Ajmal Ayan was appointed as director general and CEO. and in June 2018 Mohammad Waris Fazli was appointed as Chief Information Officer to lead the ICT direction of the company.

Seeking to grow its five percent market share, Afghan Telecom acquired access to 60 to 70 mobile towers owned by Etisalat.

References

Telecommunications companies of Afghanistan
Mobile phone companies of Afghanistan

www.salaam.af